Diana Reyes (born November 18, 1979) is a regional Mexican musical artist.

Reyes was born in La Paz, Baja California Sur, Mexico. She has released three gold records since 2004: La Reina del Pasito Duranguense, Las No. 1 de la Reina, and Te Voy a Mostrar. Reyes holds strong ties to her father's native state of Sinaloa and her mother's native Sonora.

Discography

Studio albums 
2001: La Socia
2005: La Reina del Pasito Duranguense
2005: Navidad Duranguense
2006: Las No. 1 de la Reina
2007: Te Voy a Mostrar
2008: Insatisfecha
2008: Grandes Exitos
2008: Juntos Cruzando Fronteras
2009: Edición Limitada De Lujo
2009: Nacimos Para Amarnos
2009: Sin Remordimientos
2009: Vamos A Bailar
2010: Ámame, Bésame
2011: Ajustando Cuentas
2015: Yo No Creo en los Hombres

External links
Official Website

References

1979 births
Living people
Duranguense musicians
People from La Paz, Baja California Sur
Capitol Latin artists
21st-century Mexican singers
21st-century Mexican women singers
Women in Latin music